Binawar is a town and a nagar panchayat in Badaun District in the Indian state of Uttar Pradesh. Its census code is 128304.

References

Cities and towns in Budaun district